ARA Ciudad de Rosario (Q-62) is a multi-purpose auxiliary ship of the Argentine Navy based at Puerto Madero, Buenos Aires. It was formerly USCGC Red Wood (WLM-685).

Operational service
Tasked with control and monitoring of fluvial spaces in the jurisdiction of the Naval River Area, including activities to support the community, rescue and transport of personnel and boats of the Marine Corps.

In 2004, 2008, and 2009 Ciudad de Rosario was part of a health campaign in several villages of the Paraná River, attending to clinical and dental needs of the most isolated populations. In these missions, Ciudad de Rosario was accompanied by the patrol boat . The ship underwent repairs in 2022 and remained in active service.

References

External link
ARA official web page 

Ciudad de Rosario
Ships built by the United States Coast Guard Yard
1964 ships
Auxiliary ships of Argentina